Artisan Heights, also known as 1-5 Wakefield Street, is a student accommodation high-rise tower in Manchester, England. As of 2023, it is the 17th-tallest building in Greater Manchester.

The tower sits close to Oxford Road station and the Liberty Heights building, another high-rise student accommodation block.

History

Planning
A new planning application was submitted in April 2018 to add another two storeys and increasing the number of student beds from 573 to 603. The proposal for the cladding was also changed from grey metallic to anodised bronze aluminium panels.

Construction
Work began on site in January 2018 for the demolition phase of the project, with contractor Bowmer + Kirkland clearing an existing warehouse and the music venue and nightclub Sound Control. Construction of the building started in 2018 and was completed in 2020.

Facilities
The bedrooms are arranged in a mixture of studio and 5-10 bed cluster apartments with shared kitchen facilities. Students also have access to games, TV, study, lounge and meeting rooms, a post room, laundry and cycle storage.

Gallery

References

Buildings and structures in Manchester
Residential buildings completed in 2020
2020 establishments in England
Residential buildings in Manchester